Esther Marion Pretoria James (5 November 1900 – 7 January 1990) was one of New Zealand's first professional fashion models and a keen supporter of "buy New Zealand-made." James walked the length of New Zealand in 1931–32 to raise awareness of New Zealand-made goods and improve trade during the depression. She was the first person ever to do this walk from Spirits Bay to Stewart Island and wore only New Zealand-made clothing and shoes. The walk took six months.

The soldier and member of the New Zealand Legislative Council, George Stoddart Whitmore (1829–1903), was her great-grandfather.

References

1900 births
1990 deaths
New Zealand female models
People from Pahiatua